Oktyabrsky is a rural locality (a village) in Duvansky Selsoviet, Duvansky District, Bashkortostan, Russia. The population was 220 as of 2010. There are 4 streets.

Geography 
Oktyabrsky is located 63 km west of Mesyagutovo (the district's administrative centre) by road. Potapovka is the nearest rural locality.

References 

Rural localities in Duvansky District